Sanjay Raul  (born 6 October 1976) is an Indian cricketer. He is a right-handed batsman and a right-arm offbreak bowler.

Sanjay Raul is a strokeful middle order batsman who started his international debut as part of India 'A' tour of Pakistan in early 1998. He played both of his ODIs against Pakistan at Skating & Curling Club, Toronto in 1998, but failed to perform well in the two matches. His best domestic season was in 1996/97, when he made 644 runs and took 37 wickets, and topped the batting and bowling averages for Odisha. Now he is a professional match referee on OCA. He has also played domestic cricket for Tripura. He was the Captain of India national under-19 cricket team in the year 1995/96. He was also the Captain of Odisha cricket team.

External links
 

India One Day International cricketers
Indian cricketers
Odisha cricketers
East Zone cricketers
Tripura cricketers
1976 births
Living people
People from Cuttack
Cricketers from Odisha